The Pun'gang Line, also called the Nyŏngbyŏn Line, is a non-electrified railway line of the Korean State Railway in Nyŏngbyŏn County, North P'yŏngan Province, North Korea, running from P'arwŏn on the Ch'ŏngnyŏn P'arwŏn Line to Pun'gang. This line serves the Nyŏngbyŏn Nuclear Scientific Research Centre, located just south of Pun'gang Station.

History
The line was opened sometime between 1965, when a Soviet-supplied research reactor was put into service on the research centre site, and 1980, when construction of an experimental reactor was begun.

Route 

A yellow background in the "Distance" box indicates that section of the line is not electrified.

References

Railway lines in North Korea
Standard gauge railways in North Korea